Charles “Chuck” Harwood Dalton (September 1, 1927 – January 12, 2013) was a Canadian basketball player who competed in the 1952 Summer Olympics.

Dalton was born in Windsor, Ontario, and attended the University of Western Ontario. He was a member of the Canadian basketball team which was eliminated after the group stage in the 1952 tournament. He played three matches.

References

1927 births
2013 deaths
Basketball players at the 1952 Summer Olympics
Canadian men's basketball players
Olympic basketball players of Canada
Basketball players from Windsor, Ontario
Western Mustangs basketball players